The Mount Sinai Holy Church of America(MSHCA), is a Christian church in the Holiness-Pentecostal tradition. The church is episcopal in governance. It has approximately 130 congregations in 14 states and 4 countries and a membership of over 50,000. The organization's headquarters is located in Philadelphia, PA.

History
Founded by Ida B. Robinson, the organization is the only organization founded by an African-American woman that held consistent female leadership from its founding in 1924 until February 2001.

Ida B. Robinson grew up in Pensacola, Florida, the seventh of twelve children born to Robert and Annie Bell. After her conversion as a teenager at an evangelistic street meeting, she led prayer services in homes. In 1910 she married Oliver Robinson. In search for better employment opportunities, the couple relocated from Pensacola to Philadelphia in 1917.

In Philadelphia, she began conducting street evangelism in Philadelphia under the auspices of The United Holy Church of America. In 1919, Robinson was installed as pastor of Mount Olive Holy Temple, a small mission that was affiliated with the United Holy Church.

1924 became a significant year in the life of Ida Robinson. While fasting and praying in the church for ten days, she stated that she received a revelation from God. As she related, “The Holy Ghost spoke and said, ‘Come out on Mount Sinai.” After this encounter, Robinson believed that God was calling her to “Come out on Mount Sinai,” so that “I will use you to loose the women.” On May 20, 1924, the State of Pennsylvania granted her a charter for the church under the name of the Mount Sinai Holy Church of America, Incorporated.

At its founding, women comprised six of nine members of the Board of Elders as well as the top four officers. Ida Robinson began to conduct many evangelistic works and church planting. To strengthen the general organization, an Annual Convocation was instituted. This Annual meeting was first held in Philadelphia for eight days in September, 1925, she was also consecrated as Bishop during the meeting. When she died, the denomination consisted of 84 churches, more than 160 ordained ministers of whom 125 were women, an accredited school in Philadelphia, mission work in Cuba and Guyana, and a farm in South Jersey that provided a safe haven away from the city for church members.

Doctrine
The doctrinal emphasis of the church is the inspired, infallible, authority of Scripture, belief in the trinity, conversion, repentance, salvation in the Lord Jesus Christ, justification, entire sanctification and baptism by the Holy Spirit. The Church teaches that baptism by the Holy Spirit is given to all Christian believers who ask for it. Divine healing is practiced, but not to the exclusion of medical supervision. Holiness of life and practice are emphasized. The ordinances of the Church, as act of obedience to Faith, are water baptism (immersion), the Lord's Supper (Holy Communion) and the Ordinance of Humility (foot washing).  One particular doctrine that is solidified in the denomination's history is its beliefs on gender equality. Both men and women are considered equal in reference to official ordinations and ecclesiastical rights.

Senior Bishops and Presidents
Bishop Ida B. Robinson 1924-1946 – Founder, Senior Bishop and First President 
Bishop Elmira Jeffries 1946-1964- Second President and Senior Bishop
Bishop Mary E. Jackson 1964-1983- Third President and Senior Bishop
Bishop Amy B. Stevens 1983-2000- Fourth President and Senior Bishop
Bishop Ruth E. Satchell 2000-2001- Fifth President and President Emeritus(until 2011)
Bishop Joseph H. Bell, Sr. 2001-2015- Sixth President 
Bishop Emmanuel Holland 2015–Present - Seventh President

 Bishop Ida B. Robinson was the founder, Senior Bishop, Presiding Prelate and first President from 1924 to 1946. On April 6, 1946, Ida Robinson left Philadelphia with a group of missionaries to visit some of the organization's churches in Florida. Her first stop in Florida was Jacksonville. From there she journeyed on to Winter Haven where on 20 April 1946 she died. At the time of her death, the denomination consisted of 84 churches.

Bishop Elmira Jeffries served as Senior Bishop, Presiding Prelate, and President from 1946 to 1964. She was a charter member of the denomination, and became its first vice-president. Subsequent to the death of Bishop Ida Robinson, Jeffries was set aside to the Bishopric in 1946 by Bishop W.E. Fuller, President of the Fire Baptized Holy Church. At this time, she became president of Mount Sinai Holy Church of America, Inc., and the pastor of Mount Olive Holy Temple in Philadelphia. Under her leadership, the church purchased the Physicians' and Surgeons' Hospital located 1512-1514 on 15th street in the city of Philadelphia. Today the building has been named, The Elmira Jeffries Memorial Home. On Monday, June 15, 1964, she died.

 Bishop Mary E. Jackson served as Senior Bishop, Presiding Prelate, and President from 1964 to 1983. Born in 1881, she was also a charter member of the denomination. Jackson's tenure as president was the second longest in the church's history. Jackson was 83 years old when she became the denomination's president. Bishop Jackson is accredited with the creation of the National Youth Department and National Youth Convention for the denomination. On October 26, 1980, Bishop Mary Elizabeth Jackson retired from active pastorate service. When she died on November 8, 1983, her age was 102 years making her the oldest president in the history of the church. Her administration was also the second longest in the church's history.  There is currently a book scholarship provided by the National Youth Department in honor of Bishop Mary E. Jackson.

Bishop Amy B. Stevens, DD served as Presiding Prelate, President and Senior Bishop from 1983 to 2000. Bishop Stevens was appointed President of Mount Sinai Holy Church of America, Inc., in February, 1984.  Under her administration as president of Mount Sinai Holy Church of America, Inc., she created the Mount Sinai Training Institute and the expansion of ministry on the Mount Sinai Farm. She traveled to Mount Sinai's churches in Guyana and Cuba. Bishop Stevens received an Honorary Doctorate of Theology degree from the Official Board of Christian Bible Institute and Seminary. In 1984 Bishop Stevens along with Bishop James F. Brown, Jr. (Mt. Sinai Holy Church of America),  Bishop J O Patterson (President of the Church of God in Christ), Bishop J T Bowen (President of the United Holy Church of America)and Bishop J D Ellis (Pentecostal Churches of Christ) founded the International Fellowship of Black Pentecostal Churches in Memphis, Tennessee. Bishop Steven died on Thursday, September 14, 2000. She was the last president to have been with the founder when she died in Winter Haven, Fl.

 Bishop Ruth E. Satchell, DD served as Presiding Prelate and President from 2000 to 2001. After the death of Bishop Amy Stevens, Bishop Satchell, who at that time was serving as vice president, was appointed president of the denomination. Satchell was in her mid 1990s when beginning her tenure as president. She resigned as president in 2001, making her the shortest-serving president in the church's history. After her resignation she held the title of "President Emeritus" from 2001 until her death on March 1, 2011. She served as the jurisdictional bishop of the Mid-Atlantic District of the organization and was a member of the board of bishops and pastor of two churches. Prior to her presidency Bishop Satchell served as 1st Vice President, 2nd Vice President, a member of the Board of Directors and member of the Executive Board in the organization. She was 100 years old at the time of her death.

Bishop Joseph H. Bell, Sr. was Presiding Prelate and President from 2001 until December 2015. In 2001, Bell made history by becoming the first male president of the denomination. Prior to being elected to the presidency of MSHCA in February, 2001, Bishop Bell served the corporate church as its General Secretary and Secretary of the board of directors from 1982. Bell was the pastor of the Bethel Holy Church in New York City and served as jurisdictional bishop of the New York/New England district of the organization. Bell was accredited for the creation of national church "departments" that aimed to serve particular segments of the organization. Bishop Bell passed on December 17, 2015.

Bishop Emanuel Holland assumed the office of Presiding Prelate and President of MSHCA upon the passing of the late Bishop Joseph H. Bell, Sr. on December 17, 2015. His assumption of the presidency marks the first time in the church's history that a Bishop from the organization's Southern District took the office of President.

Executive Structure
The church has 5 corporate officers, which include the president, vice president, general secretary, financial secretary, and treasurer. There is a board of bishops. Assisting the bishops is a board of presbyteries, composed of the elders of the churches. The current Executive Officers of MSHCA include: 
Bishop Emanuel Holland - President
Bishop G. Ruth Batten- Vice President
Bishop Thomas J. Martin, Jr- Corporate Treasurer
Bishop Kenneth R. Coward- Corporate Secretary/Business Administrator
Bishop Queen T. Harris- Financial Secretary

Current College of Bishops
Bishop G. Ruth Batten- Vice President, District Bishop of the Mid Atlantic District
Bishop Ronald Bryant, Sr.- Chairman of Public Relations and Communication
Bishop Kenneth R. Coward- Corporate Secretary, District Bishop of the PA/NJ District
Bishop Queen Harris- Financial Secretary 
Presiding Bishop Emanuel Holland -President, District Bishop of the Southern & Great Lakes Districts
Bishop Thomas J. Martin, Jr- Corporate Treasurer, Bishop of Missions and District Bishop of the West Coast District
Bishop Simon Phillips- District Bishop of Guyana
Bishop Hazel Woodley-  District Bishop of the New York/New England District

Ecclesiastical Structure
There are seven administrative districts: New York/New England, Pennsylvania/ New Jersey, Mid-Atlantic, Southern, Great Lakes, Guyana and the West Coast. Each district is headed by a bishop and depending on its size may have an assistant bishop. Each district has a number of "presiding elders" that provide support to the district bishop. There is an annual holy convocation of the entire church, and each district has its own convention. There is a National Youth Convention as well as a National Missionary Convention.

Administrative Departments
MSHCA has a number of administrative departments including: Women's & Men's, Education, Missions, Youth and Music. Departments are headed by chairpersons.

National Young People's Department- Evangelist Brenda Wynder Ed.D., Chairperson
National Missionary Department- Bishop Thomas J. Martin, Jr
National Women's Department- Elder Angela Clark, Chairperson
National Music Department- Elder Dean Stanley, Chairperson

Missions
MSHCA has over 50 years of history in the area of foreign missions. The organization currently has over 13 church in Cuba, and also churches established in: Jamaica, India, Dominican Republic, the Philippines and Guyana.
Within the United States local affiliated churches operate soup kitchens, visit prisons, and counsel at risk youth weekly.

MSHCA Calendar of Events
MSHCA Convocational Year begins in September and last for 12 months. During the 12-month Convocational Calendar there are 3 national meetings and 7 jurisdictional ones.

September- Holy Convocation (national meeting)
October- Great Lakes District Convention
November- Home and Foreign Missions Convention (national meeting)
February- Guyana District Convention 
March- West Coast District Convention
April- Mid-Atlantic District Convention
May- Southern District Convention
June- Pennsylvania//New Jersey District Convention
July- National Youth Convention  (national meeting)
August- New York/New England District Convention

Notable Men in MSHCA
Though women have played a highlighted role within the history of the church. There are a number of men who have held important positions in Mount Sinai Holy Church of America.

Bishop Peter F. Jones: He served as 2nd Vice President of MSHCA(the 1st male to do so)and the 1st Presiding Prelate of the Southern District (the oldest district in the denomination) from 1946–1961.
Bishop James F. Brown, Jr.: served as Vice President of the MSHCA(the 2nd Male to do so) as well as the 3rd Presiding Prelate of the Church's Southern District from 1977–1991. His tenure end when he passed August 4, 1991.
Bishop James Bell: Served as 2nd Vice President (the 1st Male) of the denomination as well as the first Presiding Prelate of the New York/New England District.
Bishop Leonard R. Williams: Served as 2nd Vice President and first Presiding Prelate of the Great Lakes District
Bishop James Odell White Sr., DD- First National Chaplain of Mt. Sinai Holy Church of America, Inc.

Prominent Past Leaders of MSHCA
Bishop Katherine C. Lewis- 2nd Vice President and Pastor of Holy Mt. Zion Church
Bishop Sylvester Webb- Pastor of Mt. Olive Holy Church, President Pentecostal Network Vice President and Black Clergy, Inc.
Bishop Charles Stevens- 1st Presiding Prelate of the Mid-Atlantic District
Bishop William Pugh- First President of the National Youth Convention, Bishop of New Jersey and Assistant District Bishop of PA/NJ District
Elder Minnie Stith- Pastor of Zion Holy Church. One of the denomination's earliest responsible for many church plants in the south
Bishop Annie Chamberlain- Vice President and Pastor of Jerusalem Holy Church
Bishop Minerva R. Bell-  First Church Historian, National Mother, and District Bishop of the New York/New England District

Related Organizations
 United Holy Church of America - The mother denomination of Mt. Sinai Holy Church
 Mount Calvary Holy Church of America - Sister denomination of Mt. Sinai Holy Church. It separated from United Holy Church 5 years after MSHCA in 1929. Founded by Bishop Brumfield Johnson.

References

External links
 
 http://www.mtsinaiyouth.org/ (National Youth Convention Website)
 https://web.archive.org/web/20130517004256/http://mtsinaimissionarydept.org/ (National Missionary Department Website)

Sources

 Official Website of the Mount Sinai Holy Church of America
 
 Lindley, Susan Hill (1996) You Have Stept Out of Your Place: A History of Women and Religion in America Westminster John Knox Press, 
 The handbook of the Mount Sinai Holy Church of America
 Daughters of Thunder: Black Women Preachers and Their Sermons, 1850-1979 By Bettye Collier-Thomas,Published by Jossey-Bass, 1997,, 
"Reshaping Black Pastoral Theology: The Vision of Bishop Ida B. Robinson" Dr. Harold Dean Trulear, Journal of Religious Thought;vol 46, 17-31p (Howard Divinity Library)
 U.S. African American Denominations in Cuba by Dodson, Jualynne E. (1994) Contributions in Black Studies: Vol. 12, Article 4. UMASS Amherst Libraries,
Encyclopedia of Women and Religion in North America: Integrating the worlds of women's religious experience in North America, by Rosemary Skinner Keller, Rosemary Radford Ruether, Marie Cantlon, Published by Indiana University Press, 2006, 
 The Ordination of Women:An Issue among ‘Spirit-filled’ Churches from the African Diaspora By Antipas L. Harris,

https://www.nwhm.org/online-exhibits/africanamerican/13.html
https://www.regent.edu/acad/global/publications/dsl_projects/owens2002.cfm
The Story of Ida Robinson, by Vivian E. Mciver · CreateSpace Independent Publishing Platform · Paperback · 30 pages · 

Pentecostal denominations
Historically African-American Christian denominations
Pentecostal churches in Pennsylvania
Christian denominations established in the 20th century
Christian organizations established in 1924
Holiness denominations
Holiness Pentecostals